Aaron Fuller (born September 30, 1997) is an American football wide receiver who is a free agent. He played college football at Washington.

Early life and high school
Fuller grew up in McKinney, Texas and attended Lovejoy High School in Lucas, Texas. As a junior, he was named the District 10-5A Offensive Player of the Year and All-Collin County after finishing the season with 69 receptions for 1,396 yards and 22 touchdowns. As a senior, Fuller caught 86 passes for 1,178 yards and 14 touchdowns with two rushing touchdowns and two punts returned for touchdowns and repeated as an All-Collin County selection. Fuller was rated a three-star recruit and committed to play college football at Washington over offers from SMU, Navy, Northwestern, Iowa, Boston College and Houston.

College career
Fuller was a member of the Washington Huskies for four seasons. He led the Huskies with 58 receptions and 874 receiving yards with four touchdowns and returned 22 punts for 122 yards in his junior season. As a senior, Fuller caught 59 passes for 702 yards and six touchdowns and returned 22 punts for 250 yards and one touchdown. Fuller finished his collegiate career with 159 receptions for 2,051 yards and 13 touchdowns in 54 games played.

Professional career

Fuller signed with the Seattle Seahawks as an undrafted free agent on May 1, 2020. He was waived on September 5, 2020, and re-signed to the practice squad the next day. Fuller remained on the practice squad for the entirety of the 2020 season and signed a reserve/futures contract with the Seahawks on January 11, 2021. He was waived at the end of the preseason on August 31, 2021, and again resigned to the practice squad on September 1. Fuller was elevated to the active roster on January 8, 2022, for the Seahawks' final game of the season against the Arizona Cardinals, where he made his NFL debut in the 38–30 victory. He signed a reserve/future contract with the Seahawks on January 10, 2022.

On August 30, 2022, Fuller was waived by the Seahawks.

References

External links
Washington Huskies bio
Seattle Seahawks bio

Living people
Players of American football from Texas
American football wide receivers
Washington Huskies football players
Seattle Seahawks players
People from McKinney, Texas
1997 births